The 1903 Davidson football team was an American football team that represented the Davidson College as an independent during the 1903 college football season. In their fourth year under head coach John A. Brewin, the team compiled a 1–4 record.

Schedule

References

Davidson
Davidson Wildcats football seasons
Davidson football